Sido may refer to:

 Sido (rapper), stage name of Paul Würdig, German rapper
 Sido (island), a South Korean island
 Sido, Mali
 River Sido, a river in Central Africa in the Chad-Central African Republic border area